μ Tauri, Latinized as Mu Tauri, is a single star in the equatorial constellation of Taurus. It has a blue-white hue and is faintly visible to the naked eye with an apparent visual magnitude of 4.27. The star is located approximately 490 light years distant from the Sun based on parallax, and is drifting further away with a radial velocity of +16 km/s.

This object has a stellar classification of B3IV, matching a B-type subgiant star. In the past this star was thought to have a variable radial velocity, but is now considered constant. It is 252 million years old and is spinning with a projected rotational velocity of 89 km/s.

References

B-type subgiants
Circumstellar disks

Taurus (constellation)
Tauri, Mu
BD+08 657
Tauri, 49
026912
019860
1320